A bishop is a person of authority in a Christian church.

Bishop, Bishops or Bishop's may also refer to:

Religious roles
 Bishop (Catholic Church)
 Bishop (Latter Day Saints)
 Bishop (Methodism)

Places

Antarctica
 Bishop Peak (Antarctica)
 Mount Bishop (Antarctica)

Canada
 Bishop Island, Nunavut
 Bishop River, British Columbia
 Bishop Street, Montreal, Quebec, Canada
 Mount Bishop (Camelsfoot Range), British Columbia
 Mount Bishop (Elk Range), on the British Columbia–Alberta boundary
 Mount Bishop (Fannin Range), British Columbia

United Kingdom
 Bishop Auckland, a town in County Durham, England, aka "Bishop"
 Bishop's ward, in the London Borough of Lambeth

United States
 Bishop, California, a city
 Bishop, Georgia, a small town
 Bishop, Illinois, an unincorporated community
 Bishop, Maryland, an unincorporated community
 Bishop, Texas, a city
 Bishop, Virginia and West Virginia, an unincorporated community
 Bishop, Washington, a ghost town
 Bishop Airport (Decatur, Texas), U.S.
 Bishop Arts District, Dallas
 Bishop Paiute Tribe reservation
 Bishop Peak (California)
 Bishop Subbasin, an aquifer in California
 Bishop's Block, Iowa
 Cecil-Bishop, Pennsylvania, aka Cecil or Bishop

Elsewhere
 Bishop Island (Queensland), Australia

People
 Bishop (musician) (b. 1992), singer-songwriter
 Bishop (surname)
 The Bishop, pseudonym of John Tomkins, a convicted American extortionist
 Robert Bishop (artist), bondage artist, known by the pseudonym "Bishop"

Animals
 Bishop, birds of the genus Euplectes in the Weaver family, Ploceidae
 Bishops (mammal), genus of Mesozoic mammals in the family Ausktribosphenidae

Arts, entertainment, and media

Fictional characters
 Bishop (Aliens), in the Alien series of films, played by Lance Henriksen
 Bishop (comics), in Marvel Comics' X-Men books
 Bishop, in the film Juice, played by Tupac Shakur 
 Bishop, a Fangire in the 2008 series Kamen Rider Kiva
 Bishop, in Tom Clancy's Rainbow Six: Vegas 2
 Bishop, in the computer game Ultima Underworld II: Labyrinth of Worlds (1993)
 Bishop, a character class in the game Wizardry
Obispo "Bishop" Losa, a main character in the FX television series Mayans M.C.
 The Bishop (Monty Python), a secret agent in a Monty Python skit

Literature
 The Bishop (novel), a 1970 novel by Scottish writer Bruce Marshall
 "The Bishop" (short story), a 1902 short story by Anton Chekhov

Music
 Bishop (American band), a Straight Edge hardcore band from Florida
 The Bishops, a British band

Schools
 Bishop College, Marshall, Texas, United States, a historically black college
 Bishop State Community College, Mobile, Alabama, US
 Bishop's University in Sherbrooke, Quebec, Canada
 Diocesan College, also known as Bishops, a school in Rondebosch in Cape Town, South Africa
 The Bishop's School (La Jolla), California, United States
 The Bishop's School (Pune), India

Other uses
 Bishop (chess), a chess piece
 Bishop (artillery), a British Second World War self-propelled gun
 Bishop, a form of mulled wine
 Bishop, a type of sleeve
 Bishop Museum, Honolulu, Hawaii, U.S.

See also
 Bishop Airport (disambiguation)
 Bishops' Wars of 1639 and 1640, wars in Scotland and England generally viewed as the starting point of the 1639–1652 Wars of the Three Kingdoms
 Supreme Bishop (Obispo Máximo), title of the leader of the Philippine Independent Church